In computing, a code page is a character encoding and as such it is a specific association of a set of printable characters and control characters with unique numbers. Typically each number represents the binary value in a single byte. (In some contexts these terms are used more precisely; see .)

The term "code page" originated from IBM's EBCDIC-based mainframe systems, but Microsoft, SAP, and Oracle Corporation are among the vendors that use this term. The majority of vendors identify their own character sets by a name. In the case when there is a plethora of character sets (like in IBM), identifying character sets through a number is a convenient way to distinguish them. Originally, the code page numbers referred to the page numbers in the IBM standard character set manual, a condition which has not held for a long time. Vendors that use a code page system allocate their own code page number to a character encoding, even if it is better known by another name; for example, UTF-8 has been assigned page numbers 1208 at IBM, 65001 at Microsoft, and 4110 at SAP.

Hewlett-Packard uses a similar concept in its HP-UX operating system and its Printer Command Language (PCL) protocol for printers (either for HP printers or not). The terminology, however, is different: What others call a character set, HP calls a symbol set, and what IBM or Microsoft call a code page, HP calls a symbol set code. HP developed a series of symbol sets, each with an associated symbol set code, to encode both its own character sets and other vendors’ character sets.

The multitude of character sets leads many vendors to recommend Unicode.

The code page numbering system 
IBM introduced the concept of systematically assigning a small, but globally unique, 16 bit number to each character encoding that a computer system or collection of computer systems might encounter. The IBM origin of the numbering scheme is reflected in the fact that the smallest (first) numbers are assigned to variations of IBM's EBCDIC encoding and slightly larger numbers refer to variations of IBM's extended ASCII encoding as used in its PC hardware.

With the release of PC DOS version 3.3 (and the near identical MS-DOS 3.3) IBM introduced the code page numbering system to regular PC users, as the code page numbers (and the phrase "code page") were used in new commands to allow the character encoding used by all parts of the OS to be set in a systematic way.

After IBM and Microsoft ceased to cooperate in the 1990s, the two companies have maintained the list of assigned code page numbers independently from each other, resulting in some conflicting assignments. At least one third-party vendor (Oracle) also has its own different list of numeric assignments. IBM's current assignments are listed in their CCSID repository, while Microsoft's assignments are documented within the MSDN. Additionally, a list of the names and approximate IANA (Internet Assigned Numbers Authority) abbreviations for the installed code pages on any given Windows machine can be found in the Registry on that machine (this information is used by Microsoft programs such as Internet Explorer).

Most well-known code pages, excluding those for the CJK languages and Vietnamese, fit all their code-points into eight bits and do not involve anything more than mapping each code-point to a single character; furthermore, techniques such as combining characters, complex scripts, etc., are not involved.

The text mode of standard (VGA-compatible) PC graphics hardware is built around using an 8-bit code page, though it is possible to use two at once with some color depth sacrifice, and up to eight may be stored in the display adaptor for easy switching. There was a selection of third-party code page fonts that could be loaded into such hardware. However, it is now commonplace for operating system vendors to provide their own character encoding and rendering systems that run in a graphics mode and bypass this hardware limitation entirely.  However the system of referring to character encodings by a code page number remains applicable, as an efficient alternative to string identifiers such as those specified by the IETF and IANA for use in various protocols such as e-mail and web pages.

Relationship to ASCII 
The majority of code pages in current use are supersets of ASCII, a 7-bit code representing 128 control codes and printable characters. In the distant past, 8-bit implementations of the ASCII code set the top bit to zero or used it as a parity bit in network data transmissions. When the top bit was made available for representing character data, a total of 256 characters and control codes could be represented. Most vendors (including IBM) used this extended range to encode characters used by various languages and graphical elements that allowed the imitation of primitive graphics on text-only output devices. No formal standard existed for these "extended ASCII character sets" and vendors referred to the variants as code pages, as IBM had always done for variants of EBCDIC encodings.

Relationship to Unicode 
Unicode is an effort to include all characters from all currently and historically used human languages into single character enumeration (effectively one large single code page), removing the need to distinguish between different code pages when handling digitally stored text. Unicode tries to retain backwards compatibility with many legacy code pages, copying some code pages 1:1 in the design process. An explicit design goal of Unicode was to allow round-trip conversion between all common legacy code pages, although this goal has not always been achieved.
Some vendors, namely IBM and Microsoft, have anachronistically assigned code page numbers to Unicode encodings. This convention allows code page numbers to be used as metadata to identify the correct decoding algorithm when encountering binary stored data.

IBM code pages

EBCDIC-based code pages 
These code pages are used by IBM in its EBCDIC character sets for mainframe computers.

 1 – USA WP, Original
 2 – USA
 3 – USA Accounting, Version A
 4 – USA
 5 – USA
 6 – Latin America
 7 – Germany F.R. / Austria
 8 – Germany F.R.
 9 – France, Belgium
 10 – Canada (English)
 11 – Canada (French)
 12 – Italy
 13 – Netherlands
 14 –
 15 – Switzerland (French)
 16 – Switzerland (French / German)
 17 – Switzerland (German)
 18 – Sweden / Finland
 19 – Sweden / Finland WP, version 2
 20 – Denmark/Norway
 21 – Brazil
 22 – Portugal
 23 – United Kingdom
 24 – United Kingdom
 25 – Japan (Latin)
 26 – Japan (Latin)
 27 – Greece (Latin)
 28 –
 29 – Iceland
 30 – Turkey
 31 – South Africa
 32 – Czechoslovakia (Czech / Slovak)
 33 – Czechoslovakia
 34 – Czechoslovakia
 35 – Romania
 36 – Romania
 37 – USA/Canada - CECP (same with euro: 1140)
 37-2 – The real 3279 APL codepage, as used by C/370. This is very close to 1047, except for caret and not-sign inverted. It is not officially recognized by IBM, even though SHARE has pointed out its existence.
 38 – USA ASCII
 39 – United Kingdom / Israel
 40 – United Kingdom
 251 – China
 252 – Poland
 254 – Hungary
 256 – International #1 (superseded by 500)
 257 – International #2
 258 – International #3
 259 – Symbols, Set 7
 260 – Canadian French - 116
 264 – Print Train & Text processing extended
 273 – Germany F.R./Austria - CECP (same with euro: 1141)
 274 – Old Belgium Code Page
 275 – Brazil - CECP
 276 – Canada (French) - 94
 277 – Denmark, Norway - CECP (same with euro: 1142)
 278 – Finland, Sweden - CECP (same with euro: 1143)
 279 – French - 94
 280 – Italy - CECP (same with euro: 1144)
 281 – Japan (Latin) - CECP
 282 – Portugal - CECP
 283 – Spain - 190
 284 – Spain/Latin America - CECP (same with euro: 1145)
 285 – United Kingdom - CECP (same with euro: 1146)
 286 – Austria / Germany F.R. Alternate
 287 – Denmark / Norway Alternate
 288 – Finland / Sweden Alternate
 289 – Spain Alternate
 290 – Japanese (Katakana) Extended
 293 – APL
 297 – France (same with euro: 1147)
 298 – Japan (Katakana)
 300 – Japan (Kanji) DBCS (For JIS X 0213)
 310 – Graphic Escape APL/TN
 320 – Hungary
 321 – Yugoslavia
 322 – Turkey
 330 – International #4
 351 – GDDM default
 352 – Printing and publishing option
 353 – BCDIC-A
 355 – PTTC/BCD standard option
 357 – PTTC/BCD H option
 358 – PTTC/BCD Correspondence option
 359 – PTTC/BCD Monocase option
 360 – PTTC/BCD Duocase option
 361 – EBCDIC Publishing International
 363 – Symbols, set 8
 382 – EBCDIC Publishing Austria, Germany F.R. Alternate
 383 – EBCDIC Publishing Belgium
 384 – EBCDIC Publishing Brazil
 385 – EBCDIC Publishing Canada (French)
 386 – EBCDIC Publishing Denmark, Norway
 387 – EBCDIC Publishing Finland, Sweden
 388 – EBCDIC Publishing France
 389 – EBCDIC Publishing Italy
 390 – EBCDIC Publishing Japan (Latin)
 391 – EBCDIC Publishing Portugal
 392 – EBCDIC Publishing Spain, Philippines
 393 – EBCDIC Publishing Latin America (Spanish Speaking)
 394 – EBCDIC Publishing China (Hong Kong), UK, Ireland
 395 – EBCDIC Publishing Australia, New Zealand, USA, Canada (English)
 410 – Cyrillic (revisions: 880, 1025, 1154)
 420 – Arabic
 421 – Maghreb/French
 423 – Greek (superseded by 875)
 424 – Hebrew (Bulletin Code)
 425 – Arabic / Latin for OS/390 Open Edition
 435 – Teletext Isomorphic
 500 – International #5 (ECECP; supersedes 256) (same with euro: 1148)
 803 – Hebrew Character Set A (Old Code)
 829 – Host Math Symbols- Publishing
 833 – Korean Extended (SBCS)
 834 – Korean Hangul (KSC5601; DBCS with UDCs)
 835 – Traditional Chinese DBCS
 836 – Simplified Chinese Extended
 837 – Simplified Chinese DBCS
 838 – Thai with Low Marks & Accented Characters (same with euro: 1160)
 839 – Thai DBCS
 870 – Latin 2 (same with euro: 1153) (revision: 1110)
 871 – Iceland (same with euro: 1149)
 875 – Greek (supersedes 423)
 880 – Cyrillic (revision of 410) (revisions: 1025, 1154)
 881 – United States - 5080 Graphics System
 882 – United Kingdom - 5080 Graphics System
 883 – Sweden - 5080 Graphics System
 884 – Germany - 5080 Graphics System
 885 – France - 5080 Graphics System
 886 – Italy - 5080 Graphics System
 887 – Japan - 5080 Graphics System
 888 – France AZERTY - 5080 Graphics System
 889 – Thailand
 890 – Yugoslavia
 892 – EBCDIC, OCR A
 893 – EBCDIC, OCR B
 905 – Latin 3
 918 – Urdu Bilingual
 924 – Latin 9
 930 – Japan MIX (290 + 300) (same with euro: 1390)
 931 – Japan MIX (37 + 300)
 933 – Korea MIX (833 + 834) (same with euro: 1364)
 935 – Simplified Chinese MIX (836 + 837) (same with euro: 1388)
 937 – Traditional Chinese MIX (37 + 835) (same with euro: 1371)
 939 – Japan MIX (1027 + 300) (same with euro: 1399)
 1001 – MICR
 1002 – EBCDIC DCF Release 2 Compatibility
 1003 – EBCDIC DCF, US Text subset
 1005 – EBCDIC Isomorphic Text Communication
 1007 – EBCDIC Arabic (XCOM2)
 1024 – EBCDIC T.61
 1025 – Cyrillic, Multilingual (same with euro: 1154) (Revision of 880)
 1026 – EBCDIC Turkey (Latin 5) (same with euro: 1155) (supersedes 905 in that country)
 1027 – Japanese (Latin) Extended (JIS X 0201 Extended)
 1028 – EBCDIC Publishing Hebrew
 1030 – Japanese (Katakana) Extended
 1031 – Japanese (Latin) Extended
 1032 – MICR, E13-B Combined
 1033 – MICR, CMC-7 Combined
 1037 – Korea - 5080/6090 Graphics System
 1039 – GML Compatibility
 1047 – Latin 1/Open Systems
 1068 – DCF Compatibility
 1069 – Latin 4
 1070 – USA / Canada Version 0 (Code page 37 Version 0)
 1071 – Germany F.R. / Austria
 1073 – Brazil
 1074 – Denmark, Norway
 1075 – Finland, Sweden
 1076 – Italy
 1077 – Japan (Latin)
 1078 – Portugal
 1079 – Spain / Latin America Version 0 (Code page 284 Version 0)
 1080 – United Kingdom
 1081 – France Version 0 (Code page 297 Version 0)
 1082 – Israel (Hebrew)
 1083 – Israel (Hebrew)
 1084 – International#5 Version 0 (Code page 500 Version 0)
 1085 – Iceland
 1087 – Symbol Set
 1091 – Modified Symbols, Set 7
  1093 – IBM Logo
 1097 – Farsi Bilingual
 1110 – Latin 2 (Revision of 870)
 1112 – Baltic Multilingual (same with euro: 1156)
 1113 – Latin 6
 1122 – Estonia (same with euro: 1157)
 1123 – Cyrillic, Ukraine (same with euro: 1158)
 1130 – Vietnamese (same with euro: 1164)
 1132 – Lao EBCDIC
 1136 – Hitachi Katakana
 1137 – Devanagari EBCDIC
 1140 – USA, Canada, etc. ECECP (same without euro: 37) (Traditional Chinese version: 1159)
 1141 – Austria, Germany ECECP (same without euro: 273)
 1142 – Denmark, Norway ECECP (same without euro: 277)
 1143 – Finland, Sweden ECECP (same without euro: 278)
 1144 – Italy ECECP (same without euro: 280)
 1145 – Spain, Latin America (Spanish) ECECP (same without euro: 284)
 1146 – UK ECECP (same without euro: 285)
 1147 – France ECECP with euro (same without euro: 297)
 1148 – International ECECP with euro (same without euro: 500)
 1149 – Icelandic ECECP with euro (same without euro: 871)
 1150 – Korean Extended with box characters
 1151 – Simplified Chinese Extended with box characters
 1152 – Traditional Chinese Extended with box characters
 1153 – Latin 2 Multilingual with euro (same without euro: 870)
 1154 – Cyrillic, Multilingual with euro (same without euro: 1025; an older version is * 1166)
 1155 – Turkey with euro (same without euro: 1026)
 1156 – Baltic Multi with euro (same without euro: 1112)
 1157 – Estonia with euro (same without euro: 1122)
 1158 – Cyrillic, Ukraine with euro (same without euro: 1123)
 1159 – T-Chinese EBCDIC (Traditional Chinese euro update of * 1140)
 1160 – Thai with Low Marks & Accented Characters with euro (same without euro: 838)
 1164 – Vietnamese with euro (same without euro: 1130)
 1165 – Latin 2/Open Systems
 1166 – Cyrillic Kazakh
 1278 – EBCDIC Adobe (PostScript) Standard Encoding
 1279 – Hitachi Japanese Katakana Host
 1303 – EBCDIC Bar Code
 1364 – Korea MIX (833 + 834 + euro) (same without euro: 933)
 1371 – Traditional Chinese MIX (1159 + 835) (same without euro: 937)
 1376 – Traditional Chinese DBCS Host extension for HKSCS
 1377 – Mixed Host HKSCS Growing (37 + 1376)
 1388 – Simplified Chinese MIX (same without euro: 935) (836 + 837 + euro)
 1390 – Simplified Chinese MIX Japan MIX (same without euro: 930) (290 + 300 + euro)
 1399 – Japan MIX (1027 + 300 + euro) (same without euro: 939)

DOS code pages 
These code pages are used by IBM in its PC DOS operating system. These code pages were originally embedded directly in the text mode hardware of the graphic adapters used with the IBM PC and its clones, including the original MDA and CGA adapters whose character sets could only be changed by physically replacing a ROM chip that contained the font.  The interface of those adapters (emulated by all later adapters such as VGA) was typically limited to single byte character sets with only 256 characters in each font/encoding (although VGA added partial support for slightly larger character sets).

 301 – IBM-PC Japan (Kanji) DBCS
 437 – Original IBM PC hardware code page
 720 – Arabic (Transparent ASMO)
 737 – Greek
 775 – Latin-7
 808 – Russian with euro (same without euro: 866)
 848 – Ukrainian with euro (same without euro: 1125)
 849 – Belorussian with euro (same without euro: 1131)
 850 – Latin-1
 851 – Greek
 852 – Latin-2
 853 – Latin-3
 855 – Cyrillic (same with euro: 872)
 856 – Hebrew
 857 – Latin-5
 858 – Latin-1 with euro symbol
 859 – Latin-9
 860 – Portuguese
 861 – Icelandic
 862 – Hebrew
 863 – Canadian French
 864 – Arabic
 865 – Danish/Norwegian
 866 – Belarusian, Russian, Ukrainian (same with euro: 808)
 867 – Hebrew + euro (based on CP862) (conflictive ID: NEC Czech (Kamenický), which was created before this codepage)
 868 – Urdu
 869 – Greek
 872 – Cyrillic with euro (same without euro: 855)
 874 – Thai with Low Tone Marks & Ancient Chars (conflictive ID with Windows 874; version with euro: 1161 Windows version: is IBM 1162)
 876 – OCR A
 877 – OCR B
 878 – KOI8-R
 891 – Korean PC SBCS
 898 – IBM-PC WP Multilingual
 899 – IBM-PC Symbol
 903 – Simplified Chinese PC SBCS
 904 – Traditional Chinese PC SBCS
 906 – International Set #5 3812/3820
 907 – ASCII APL (3812)
 909 – IBM-PC APL2 Extended
 910 – IBM-PC APL2
 911 – IBM-PC Japan #1
 926 – Korean PC DBCS
 927 – Traditional Chinese PC DBCS
 928 – Simplified Chinese PC DBCS
 929 – Thai PC DBCS
 932 – IBM-PC Japan MIX (DOS/V) (DBCS) (897 + 301) (conflictive ID with Windows 932; Windows version is IBM 943)
 934 – IBM-PC Korea MIX (DOS/V) (DBCS) (891 + 926)
 936 – IBM-PC Simplified Chinese MIX (gb2312) (DOS/V) (DBCS) (903 + 928) (conflictive ID with Windows 936; Windows version is IBM 1386)
 938 – IBM-PC Traditional Chinese MIX (DOS/V, OS/2) (904 + 927)
 942 – IBM-PC Japan MIX (Japanese SAA (OS/2)) (1041 + 301)
 943 – IBM-PC Japan OPEN (897 + 941) (Windows CP 932)
 944 – IBM-PC Korea MIX (Korean SAA (OS/2)) (1040 + 926)
 946 – IBM-PC Simplified Chinese (Simplified Chinese SAA (OS/2)) (1042 + 928)
 948 – IBM-PC Traditional Chinese (Traditional Chinese SAA (OS/2)) (1043 + 927)
 949 – Korean (Extended Wansung (ks_c_5601-1987)) (1088 + 951) (conflictive ID with Windows 949 (Unified Hangul Code); Windows version is IBM 1363)
 951 – Korean DBCS (IBM KS Code) (conflictive ID with Windows 951, a hack of Windows 950 with Unicode mappings for some PUA Unicode characters found in HKSCS, based on the file name)
 1034 – Printer Application - Shipping Label, Set #2
 1040 – Korean Extended
 1041 – Japanese Extended (JIS X 0201 Extended)
 1042 – Simplified Chinese Extended
 1043 – Traditional Chinese Extended
 1044 – Printer Application - Shipping Label, Set #1
 1086 – IBM-PC Japan #1
 1088 – Revised Korean (SBCS)
 1092 – IBM-PC Modified Symbols
 1098 – Farsi
 1108 – DITROFF Base Compatibility
 1109 – DITROFF Specials Compatibility
 1115 – IBM-PC People's Republic of China
 1116 – Estonian
 1117 – Latvian
 1118 – Lithuanian (IBM's implementation of Lika's code page 774)
 1119 – Lithuanian and Russian (IBM's implementation of Lika's code page 772)
 1125 – Cyrillic, Ukrainian (same with euro: 848) (IBM modification of RUSCII)
 1127 – IBM-PC Arabic / French
 1131 – IBM-PC Data, Cyrillic, Belarusian (same with euro: 849)
 1139 – Japan Alphanumeric Katakana
 1161 – Thai with Low Tone Marks & Ancient Chars with euro  (same without euro: 874)
 1167 – KOI8-RU
 1168 – KOI8-U
 1300 – ANSI [PTS-DOS 6.70, not 6.51]
 1370 – Traditional Chinese MIX (Big5 encoding) (1114 + 947 + euro) (same without euro: 950)
 1380 – IBM-PC Simplified Chinese GB PC-DATA (DBCS PC IBM GB 2312-80)
 1381 – IBM-PC Simplified Chinese (1115 + 1380)
 1393 – Japanese JIS X 0213 DBCS
 1394 – IBM-PC Japan (JIS X 0213) (897 + 1393)

When dealing with older hardware, protocols and file formats, it is often necessary to support these code pages, but newer encoding systems, in particular Unicode, are encouraged for new designs.

DOS code pages are typically stored in .CPI files.

IBM AIX code pages 
These code pages are used by IBM in its AIX operating system. They emulate several character sets, namely those ones designed to be used accordingly to ISO, such as UNIX-like operating systems.

 367 – 7-bit US-ASCII
 371 – 7-bit US-ASCII APL
 806 – ISCII
 813 – ISO 8859-7
 819 – ISO 8859-1
 895 – 7-bit Japan Latin
 896 – 7-bit Japan Katakana Extended
 901 – Extension of ISO 8859-13 with euro (same without euro: 921)
 902 – ISO Estonian with euro (same without euro: 922)
 912 – Extension of ISO 8859-2
 913 – ISO 8859-3
 914 – ISO 8859-4
 915 – Extension of ISO 8859-5
 916 – ISO 8859-8
 919 – ISO 8859-10
 920 – ISO 8859-9
 921 – Extension of ISO 8859-13 (same with euro: 901)
 922 – ISO Estonian (same with euro: 902)
 923 – ISO 8859-15
 952 – EUC Japanese for JIS X 0208
 953 – EUC Japanese for JIS X 0212
 954 – EUC Japanese (895 + 952 + 896 + 953)
 955 – TCP Japanese, JIS X 0208-1978
 956 – TCP Japanese (895 + 952 + 896 + 953)
 957 – TCP Japanese (895 + 955 + 896 + 953)
 958 – TCP Japanese (367 + 952 + 896 + 953)
 959 – TCP Japanese (367 + 955 + 896 + 953)
 960 – Traditional Chinese DBCS-EUC SICGCC Primary Set (1st plane)
 961 – Traditional Chinese DBCS-EUC SICGCC Full Set + IBM Select + UDC
 963 – Traditional Chinese TCP, CNS 11643 plane 2 only
 964 – EUC Traditional Chinese (367 + 960 + 961)
 965 – TCP Traditional Chinese (367 + 960 + 963)
 970 – EUC Korean (367 + 971)
 971 – EUC Korean DBCS (G1, KSC 5601 1989 (including 188 UDC))
 1006 – ISO 8-bit Urdu
 1008 – ISO 8-bit Arabic
 1009 – 7-bit ISO IRV
 1010 – 7-bit France
 1011 – 7-bit Germany F.R.
 1012 – 7-bit Italy
 1013 – 7-bit United Kingdom
 1014 – 7-bit Spain
 1015 – 7-bit Portugal
 1016 – 7-bit Norway
 1017 – 7-bit Denmark
 1018 – 7-bit Finland/Sweden
 1019 – 7-bit Netherlands
 1029 – Arabic Extended
 1036 – CCITT T.61
 1046 – Arabic Extended (Euro)
 1089 – ISO 8859-6
 1111 – ISO 8859-2
 1124 – ISO Ukrainian, similar to ISO 8859-5
 1129 – ISO Vietnamese (same with euro: 1163)
 1133 – ISO Lao
 1163 – ISO Vietnamese with euro (same without euro: 1129)
 1350 – EUC Japanese (JISeucJP) (367 + 952 + 896 + 953)
 1382 – EUC Simplified Chinese (DBCS PC GB 2312-80)
 1383 – EUC Simplified Chinese (367 + 1382)

Code page 819 is identical to Latin-1, ISO/IEC 8859-1, and with slightly-modified commands, permits MS-DOS machines to use that encoding. It was used with IBM AS/400 minicomputers.

IBM OS/2 code pages 
These code pages are used by IBM in its OS/2 operating system.
 1004 – Latin-1 Extended, Desk Top Publishing/Windows

Windows emulation code pages 
These code pages are used by IBM when emulating the Microsoft Windows character sets. Most of these code pages have the same number as Microsoft code pages, although they are not exactly identical. Some code pages, though, are new from IBM, not devised by Microsoft.

 897 – IBM-PC SBCS Japanese (JIS X 0201-1976)
 941 – IBM-PC Japanese DBCS for Open environment
 947 – IBM-PC DBCS for (Big5 encoding)
 950 – Traditional Chinese MIX (Big5 encoding) (1114 + 947) (same with euro: 1370)
 1114 – IBM-PC SBCS (Simplified Chinese; GBK; Traditional Chinese; Big5 encoding)
 1126 – IBM-PC Korean SBCS
 1162 – Windows Thai (Extension of 874; but still called that in Windows)
 1169 – Windows Cyrillic Asian
 1174 – Windows Kazakh
 1250 – Windows Central Europe
 1251 – Windows Cyrillic
 1252 – Windows Western
 1253 – Windows Greek
 1254 – Windows Turkish
 1255 – Windows Hebrew
 1256 – Windows Arabic
 1257 – Windows Baltic
 1258 – Windows Vietnamese
 1361 – Korean (JOHAB)
 1362 – Korean Hangul DBCS
 1363 – Windows Korean (1126 + 1362) (Windows CP 949)
 1372 – IBM-PC MS T Chinese Big5 encoding (Special for DB2)
 1373 – Windows Traditional Chinese (extension of 950)
 1374 – IBM-PC DB Big5 encoding extension for HKSCS
 1375 – Mixed Big5 encoding extension for HKSCS (intended to match 950)
 1385 – IBM-PC Simplified Chinese DBCS (Growing CS for GB18030, also used for GBK PC-DATA.)
 1386 – IBM-PC Simplified Chinese GBK (1114 + 1385) (Windows CP 936)
 1391 – Simplified Chinese 4 Byte (Growing CS for GB18030, also used for GBK PC-DATA.)
 1392 – IBM-PC Simplified Chinese MIX (1252 + 1385 + 1391)

Macintosh emulation code pages 
These code pages are used by IBM when emulating the Apple Macintosh character sets.

 1275 – Apple Roman
 1280 – Apple Greek
 1281 – Apple Turkish
 1282 – Apple Central European
 1283 – Apple Cyrillic
 1284 – Apple Croatian
 1285 – Apple Romanian
 1286 – Apple Icelandic

Adobe emulation code pages 
These code pages are used by IBM when emulating the Adobe character sets.

 1038 – Adobe Symbol Encoding
 1276 – Adobe (PostScript) Standard Encoding
 1277 – Adobe (PostScript) Latin 1

HP emulation code pages 
These code pages are used by IBM when emulating the HP character sets.

 1050 – HP Roman Extension
 1051 – HP Roman-8
 1052 – HP Gothic Legal
 1053 – HP Gothic-1 (almost the same as ISO 8859-1)
 1054 – HP ASCII
 1055 – HP PC-Line
 1056 – HP Line Draw
 1057 – HP PC-8 (almost the same as code page 437)
 1058 – HP PC-8DN (not the same as code page 865)
 1351 – Japanese DBCS HP character set
 5039 – Japanese MIX (1041 + 1351)

DEC emulation code pages 
These code pages are used by IBM when emulating the DEC character sets.

 1020 – 7-bit Canadian (French) NRC Set
 1021 – 7-bit Switzerland NRC Set
 1023 – 7-bit Spanish NRC Set
 1090 – Special Characters and Line Drawing Set
 1100 – DEC Multinational
 1101 – 7-bit British NRC Set
 1102 – 7-bit Dutch NRC Set
 1103 – 7-bit Finnish NRC Set
 1104 – 7-bit French NRC Set
 1105 – 7-bit Norwegian/Danish NRC Set
 1106 – 7-bit Swedish NRC Set
 1107 – 7-bit Norwegian/Danish NRC Alternate
 1287 – DEC Greek
 1288 – DEC Turkish

IBM Unicode code pages 

 1200 – UTF-16BE Unicode (big-endian) with IBM Private Use Area (PUA)
 1201 – UTF-16BE Unicode (big-endian)
 1202 – UTF-16LE Unicode (little-endian) with IBM PUA
 1203 – UTF-16LE Unicode (little-endian)
 1208 – UTF-8 Unicode with IBM PUA
 1209 – UTF-8 Unicode
 1400 – ISO 10646 UCS-BMP (Based on Unicode 6.0)
 1401 – ISO 10646 UCS-SMP (Based on Unicode 6.0)
 1402 – ISO 10646 UCS-SIP (Based on Unicode 6.0)
 1414 – ISO 10646 UCS-SSP (Based on Unicode 4.0)
 1445 – IBM AFP PUA No. 1
 1446 – ISO 10646 UCS-PUP15 (Based on Unicode 4.0)
 1447 – ISO 10646 UCS-PUP16 (Based on Unicode 4.0)
 1448 – UCS-BMP (Generic UDC)
 1449 – IBM default PUA

Microsoft code pages

Windows code pages 
These code pages are used by Microsoft in its own Windows operating system. Microsoft defined a number of code pages known as the ANSI code pages (as the first one, 1252 was based on an apocryphal ANSI draft of what became ISO 8859-1). Code page 1252 is built on ISO 8859-1 but uses the range 0x80-0x9F for extra printable characters rather than the C1 control codes from ISO 6429 mentioned by ISO 8859-1. Some of the others are based in part on other parts of ISO 8859 but often rearranged to make them closer to 1252.

 874 – Windows Thai
 1250 – Windows Central Europe
 1251 – Windows Cyrillic
 1252 – Windows Western
 1253 – Windows Greek
 1254 – Windows Turkish
 1255 – Windows Hebrew
 1256 – Windows Arabic
 1257 – Windows Baltic
 1258 – Windows Vietnamese

Microsoft recommends new applications use UTF-8 or UCS-2/UTF-16 instead of these code pages.

DBCS code pages 
These code pages represent DBCS character encodings for various CJK languages. In Microsoft operating systems, these are used as both the "OEM" and "Windows" code page for the applicable locale.

 932 – Supports Japanese Shift-JIS
 936 – Supports Simplified Chinese GBK
 949 – Supports Korean Unified Hangul Code
 950 – Supports Traditional Chinese Big5

MS-DOS code pages 
These code pages are used by Microsoft in its MS-DOS operating system. Microsoft refers to these as the OEM code pages because they were defined by the original equipment manufacturers who licensed MS-DOS for distribution with their hardware, not by Microsoft or a standards organization. Most of these code pages have the same number as the equivalent IBM code pages, although some are not exactly identical.

 708 – Arabic (ASMO 708)
 709 – Arabic (ASMO 449+/BCON V4)
 710 – Arabic (Transparent Arabic)
 720 – Arabic (Transparent ASMO)
 737 – Greek
 850 – Latin-1
 851 – Greek
 852 – Latin-2
 855 – Cyrillic
 857 – Latin-5
 858 – Latin-1 with euro symbol
 859 – Latin-9
 860 – Portuguese
 861 – Icelandic
 862 – Hebrew
 863 – Canadian French
 864 – Arabic
 865 – Danish/Norwegian
 866 – Belarusian, Russian, Ukrainian
 869 – Greek

Macintosh emulation code pages 
These code pages are used by Microsoft when emulating the Apple Macintosh character sets.

 10000 - Apple Macintosh Roman
 10001 - Apple Japanese
 10002 - Apple Traditional Chinese (Big5)
 10003 - Apple Korean
 10004 - Apple Arabic
 10005 - Apple Hebrew
 10006 - Apple Greek
 10007 - Apple Macintosh Cyrillic
 10008 - Apple Simplified Chinese (GB 2312)
 10010 - Apple Romanian
 10017 - Apple Ukrainian
 10021 - Apple Thai
 10029 - Apple Macintosh Central Europe
 10079 - Apple Icelandic
 10081 - Apple Turkish
 10082 - Apple Croatian

Various other Microsoft code pages 
The following code page numbers are specific to Microsoft Windows. IBM may use different numbers for these code pages. They emulate several character sets, namely those ones designed to be used accordingly to ISO, such as UNIX-like operating systems.

 20000 – Traditional Chinese CNS
 20001 – Traditional Chinese TCA
 20002 – Traditional Chinese ETEN
 20003 – Traditional Chinese IBM5500
 20004 – Traditional Chinese TeleText
 20005 – Traditional Chinese Wang
 20105 – 7-bit IA5 IRV (CP 1009)
 20106 – 7-bit IA5 German (DIN 66003)
 20107 – 7-bit IA5 Swedish (SEN 850200 C)
 20108 - 7-bit IA5 Norwegian (NS 4551-2)
 20127 – 7-bit US-ASCII
 20261 – CCITT T.61
 20269 – ISO 6937
 20273
 20277
 20278
 20284
 20285
 20290 - Japanese language in EBCDIC
 20297
 20420
 20423
 20424
 20833
 20838
 20866 – KOI8-R
 20871
 20880 – EBCDIC Cyrillic (880)
 20905
 20924
 20932 - EUC-JP
 20936
 20949
 21025 – EBCDIC Cyrillic (1025)
 21027
 21866 – KOI8-U
 28591 – ISO-8859-1
 28592 – ISO-8859-2
 28593 – ISO-8859-3
 28594 – ISO-8859-4
 28595 – ISO-8859-5
 28596 – ISO-8859-6
 28597 – ISO-8859-7
 28598 – ISO-8859-8
 28599 – ISO-8859-9
 28600 – ISO-8859-10
 28601 – ISO-8859-11
 28602 – not used (reserved for ISO-8859-12)
 28603 – ISO-8859-13
 28604 – ISO-8859-14
 28605 – ISO-8859-15
 28606 – ISO-8859-16
 38596 – ISO-8859-6
 38598 – ISO-8859-8

Microsoft Unicode code pages 

 1200 – UTF-16LE Unicode (little-endian)
 1201 – UTF-16BE Unicode (big-endian)
 12000 – UTF-32LE Unicode (little-endian)
 12001 – UTF-32BE Unicode (big-endian)
 65000 – UTF-7 Unicode
 65001 – UTF-8 Unicode
 65520 – Empty Unicode Plane

HP Symbol Sets 
HP developed a series of Symbol Sets (each with its associated Symbol Set Code) to encode either its own character sets or other vendors’ character sets. They are normally 7-bit character sets which, when moved to the higher part and associated with the ASCII character set, make up 8-bit character sets.

HP own Symbol Sets 

 Symbol Set 0E — HP Roman Extension — 7-bit character set with accented letters (coded by IBM as code page 1050)
 Symbol Set 0G — HP 7-bit German
 Symbol Set 0L — HP Line Draw (coded by IBM as code page 1056)
 Symbol Set 0M — HP Math-7
 Symbol Set 0T — HP Thai-8
 Symbol Set 1S — HP 7-bit Spanish
 Symbol Set 1U — HP 7-bit Gothic Legal (coded by IBM as code page 1052)
 Symbol Set 4Q — 7-bit PC Line (coded by IBM as code page 1055)
 Symbol Set 4U — HP Roman-9 — Roman-8 + €
 Symbol Set 7J — HP Desktop
 Symbol Set 7S — HP 7-bit European Spanish
 Symbol Set 8E — HP East-8
 Symbol Set 8G — HP Greek-8 (based on IR 088; not on ELOT 927)
 Symbol Set 8H — HP Hebrew-8
 Symbol Set 8I — MS LineDraw (ASCII + HP PC Line)
 Symbol Set 8K — HP Kana-8 (ASCII + Japanese Katakana)
 Symbol Set 8L — HP LineDraw (ASCII + HP Line Draw)
 Symbol Set 8M — HP Math-8 (ASCII + HP Math-8)
 Symbol Set 8R — HP Cyrillic-8
 Symbol Set 8S — HP 7-bit Latin American Spanish
 Symbol Set 8T — HP Turkish-8
 Symbol Set 8U — HP Roman-8 (ASCII + HP Roman Extension; coded by IBM as code page 1051)
 Symbol Set 8V — HP Arabic-8
 Symbol Set 9K — HP Korean-8
 Symbol Set 9T — PC 8T (also known as Code Page 437-T; this is not code page 857)
 Symbol Set 9V — Latin / Arabic for Windows (this is not code page 1256)
 Symbol Set 11U — PC 8D/N (also known as Code Page 437-N; coded by IBM as code page 1058; this is not code page 865)
 Symbol set 14G — PC-8 Greek Alternate (also known as Code Page 437-G; almost the same as code page 737)
 Symbol Set 18K —
 Symbol Set 18T —
 Symbol Set 19C —
 Symbol Set 19K —

Symbol Sets from other vendors 

 Symbol Set 0D — ISO 60: 7-bit Norwegian
 Symbol Set 0F — ISO 25: 7-bit French
 Symbol Set 0H — HP 7-bit Hebrew — Practically the same as Israeli Standard SI 960
 Symbol Set 0I — ISO 15: 7-bit Italian
 Symbol Set 0K — ISO 14: 7-bit Japanese Katakana
 Symbol Set 0N — ISO 8859-1 Latin 1 (Initially called "Gothic-1"; coded by IBM as code page 1052)
 Symbol Set 0R — ISO 8859-5 Latin/Cyrillic (1986 version — IR 111)
 Symbol Set 0S — ISO 11: 7-bit Swedish
 Symbol Set 0U — ISO 6: 7-bit U.S.
 Symbol Set 0V — Arabic
 Symbol Set 1D — ISO 61: 7-bit Norwegian
 Symbol Set 1E — ISO 4: 7-bit U. K.
 Symbol Set 1F — ISO 69: 7-bit French
 Symbol Set 1G — ISO 21: 7-bit German
 Symbol Set 1K — ISO 13: 7-bit Japanese Latin
 Symbol Set 1T — Windows Thai (Practically the same as 874)
 Symbol Set 2K — ISO 57: 7-bit Simplified Chinese Latin
 Symbol Set 2N — ISO 8859-2 Latin 2
 Symbol Set 2S — ISO 17: 7-bit Spanish
 Symbol Set 2U — ISO 2: 7-bit International Reference Version
 Symbol Set 3N — ISO 8859-3 Latin 3
 Symbol Set 3R — PC-866 Russia (Practically the same as code page 866)
 Symbol Set 3S — ISO 10: 7-bit Swedish
 Symbol Set 4N — ISO 8859-4 Latin 4
 Symbol Set 4S — ISO 16: 7-bit Portuguese
 Symbol Set 5M — PS Math Symbol (Practically the same as Adobe Symbols)
 Symbol Set 5N — ISO 8859-9 Latin 5
 Symbol Set 5S — ISO 84: 7-bit Portuguese
 Symbol Set 5T — Windows 3.1 Latin-5 (Practically the same as code page 1254)
 Symbol Set 6J — Microsoft Publishing
 Symbol Set 6M — Ventura Math
 Symbol Set 6N — ISO 8859-10 Latin 6
 Symbol Set 6S — ISO 85: 7-bit Spanish
 Symbol Set 7H — ISO 8859-8 Latin/Hebrew
 Symbol Set 9E — Windows 3.1 Latin 2 (Practically the same as code page 1250)
 Symbol Set 9G — Windows 98 Greek (Practically the same as code page 1253)
 Symbol Set 9J — PC 1004
 Symbol Set 9L — Ventura ITC Zapf Dingbats
 Symbol Set 9N — ISO 8859-15 Latin 9
 Symbol Set 9R — Windows 98 Cyrillic (Practically the same as code page 1251)
 Symbol Set 9U — Windows 3.0
 Symbol Set 10G — PC-851 Latin/Greek (Practically the same as code page 851)
 Symbol Set 10J — PS Text (Practically the same as Adobe Standard)
 Symbol Set 10L — PS ITC Zapf Dingbats (Practically the same as Adobe Dingbats)
 Symbol Set 10N — ISO 8859-5 Latin/Cyrillic (1988 version — IR 144)
 Symbol Set 10R — PC-855 Cyrillic (Practically the same as code page 855)
 Symbol Set 10T — Teletex
 Symbol Set 10U — PC-8 (Practically the same as code page 437; coded by IBM as code page 1057)
 Symbol Set 10V — CP-864 (Practically the same as code page 864)
 Symbol Set 11G — CP-869 (Practically the same as code page 869)
 Symbol Set 11J — PS ISO Latin-1 (Practically the same as Adobe Latin-1)
 Symbol Set 11N — ISO 8859-6 Latin/Arabic
 Symbol Set 12G — PC Latin/Greek (Practically the same as code page 737)
 Symbol Set 12J — MC Text (Practically the same as Macintosh Roman)
 Symbol Set 12N — ISO 8859-7 Latin/Greek
 Symbol Set 12R — PC Gost (Practically the same as PC GOST Main)
 Symbol Set 12U — PC-850 Latin 1 (Practically the same as code page 850)
 Symbol Set 13J — Ventura International
 Symbol Set 13R — PC Bulgarian (Practically the same as MIK)
 Symbol Set 13U — PC-858 Latin 1 + € (Practically the same as code page 858)
 Symbol Set 14J — Ventura U. S.
 Symbol Set 14L — Windows Dingbats
 Symbol Set 14P — ABICOMP International (Practically the same as ABICOMP)
 Symbol Set 14R — PC Ukrainian (Practically the same as RUSCII)
 Symbol Set 15H — PC-862 Israel (Practically the same as code page 862)
 Symbol Set 16U — PC-857 Latin 5 (Practically the same as code page 857)
 Symbol Set 17U — PC-852 Latin 2 (Practically the same as code page 852)
 Symbol Set 18N — UTF-8
 Symbol Set 18U — PC-853 Latin 3 (Practically the same as code page 853)
 Symbol Set 19L — Windows 98 Baltic (Practically the same as code page 1257)
 Symbol Set 19M — Windows Symbol
 Symbol Set 19U — Windows 3.1 Latin 1 (Practically the same as code page 1252)
 Symbol Set 20U — PC-860 Portugal (Practically the same as code page 860)
 Symbol Set 21U — PC-861 Iceland (Practically the same as code page 861)
 Symbol Set 23U — PC-863 Canada - French (Practically the same as code page 863)
 Symbol Set 24Q — PC-Polish Mazowia (Practically the same as Mazovia encoding)
 Symbol Set 25U — PC-865 Denmark/Norway (Practically the same as code page 865)
 Symbol Set 26U — PC-775 Latin 7 (Practically the same as code page 775)
 Symbol Set 27Q — PC-8 PC Nova (Practically the same as PC Nova)
 Symbol Set 27U — PC Latvian Russian (also known as 866-Latvian)
 Symbol Set 28U — PC Lithuanian/Russian (Practically the same as code page 774)
 Symbol Set 29U — PC-772 Lithuanian/Russian (Practically the same as code page 772)

Code pages from other vendors 
These code pages are independent assignments by third party vendors. Since the original IBM PC code page (number 437) was not really designed for international use, several partially compatible country or region specific variants emerged.

These code pages number assignments are not official neither by IBM, neither by Microsoft and almost none of them is referred as a usable character set by IANA. The numbers assigned to these code pages are arbitrary and may clash to registered numbers in use by IBM or Microsoft. Some of them may predate codepage switching being added in DOS 3.3.

 100 – DOS Hebrew hardware fontpage (Not from IBM; HDOS)
 111 – DOS Greek (Not from IBM; AST Premium Exec DOS 5.0)
 112 – DOS Turkish (Not from IBM; AST Premium Exec DOS 5.0)
 113 – DOS Yugoslavian (Not from IBM; AST Premium Exec DOS 5.0)
 151 – DOS Nafitha Arabic (Not from IBM; ADOS)
 152 – DOS Nafitha Arabic (Not from IBM; ADOS)
 161 – DOS Arabic (Not from IBM; ADOS)
 162 – DOS Arabic (Not from IBM; ADOS)
 163 – DOS Arabic (Not from IBM; ADOS)
 164 – DOS Arabic (Not from IBM; ADOS)
 165 – DOS Arabic (Not from IBM; ADOS)
 166 – IBM Arabic PC (ADOS)
 210 – DEC DOS Greek (NEC Jetmate printers)
 220 – DEC DOS Spanish (Not from IBM)
 489 – Czechoslovakian [OCR software 1993]
 620 – DOS Polish (Mazovia) (Not from IBM)
 667 – DOS Polish (Mazovia) (Not from IBM)
 668 – DOS Polish (Not from IBM)
 706 – MS-DOS Server Arabic Sakhr (Not from IBM; Sakhr Software from MSX Computers)
 707 – MS-DOS Arabic Sakhr (Not from IBM; Sakhr Software from MSX Computers)
 711 – MS-DOS Arabic Nafitha Enhanced (Not from IBM)
 714 – MS-DOS Arabic Sakr (Not from IBM)
 715 – MS-DOS Arabic APTEC (Not from IBM)
 721 – MS-DOS Arabic Nafitha International (Not from IBM)
 768 – Arabic Al-Arabi (Not from IBM)
 770 – DOS Estonian, Latvian, Lithuanian (From Lithuanian Lika Software; Lithuanian RST 1095-89 National Standard)
 771 – DOS Lithuanian/Cyrillic — KBL (From Lithuanian Lika Software)
 772 – DOS Lithuanian/Cyrillic (From Lithuanian Lika Software; Lithuanian LST 1284:1993 National Standard; adopted by IBM as code page 1119)
 773 – DOS Latin-7 — KBL (From Lithuanian Lika Software)
 774 – DOS Lithuanian (From Lithuanian Lika Software; Lithuanian LST 1283:1993 National Standard; adopted by IBM as code page 1118)
 775 – DOS Latin-7 Baltic Rim (From Lithuanian Lika Software; Lithuanian LST 1590-1 National Standard; adopted by IBM and Microsoft as code page 775)
 776 – DOS Lithuanian (extended CP770) (From Lithuanian Lika Software)
 777 – DOS Accented Lithuanian (old) (extended CP773) — KBL (From Lithuanian Lika Software)
 778 – DOS Accented Lithuanian (extended CP775) (From Lithuanian Lika Software)
 790 – DOS Polish (Mazovia)
 854 – Spanish
 881 – Latin 1 (Not from IBM; AST Premium Exec DOS 5.0) (conflictive ID with IBM EBCDIC 881)
 882 – Latin 2 (ISO 8859-2) (Not from IBM; same as Code page 912; AST Premium Exec DOS 5.0) (conflictive ID with IBM EBCDIC 882)
 883 – Latin 3 (Not from IBM; AST Premium Exec DOS 5.0) (conflictive ID with IBM EBCDIC 883)
 884 – Latin 4 (Not from IBM; AST Premium Exec DOS 5.0) (conflictive ID with IBM EBCDIC 884)
 885 – Latin 5 (Not from IBM; AST Premium Exec DOS 5.0) (conflictive ID with IBM EBCDIC 885)
 895 – Czech (Kamenický), (Not from IBM; conflictive ID with IBM CP895 — 7-bit EUC Japanese Roman)
 896 – DOS Polish (Mazovia) (Not from IBM; conflictive ID with IBM CP896 — 7-bit EUC Japanese Katakana)
 900 – DOS Russian (Russian MS-DOS 5.0 LCD.CPI)
 928 – Greek (on Star printers); same as Greek National Standard ELOT 928 (Not from IBM; conflictive ID with IBM CP928 — Simplified Chinese PC DBCS)
 966 – Saudi Arabian (Not from IBM)
 991 – DOS Polish (Mazovia) (Not from IBM)
 999 – DOS Serbo-Croatian I (Not from IBM); also known as PC Nova and CroSCII; lower part is JUSI.B1.002, upper part is code page 437; supports Slovenian and Serbo-Croatian (Latin script)
 1001 – Arabic (on Star printers) (Not from IBM; conflictive ID with IBM CP1001 — MICR)
 1261 – Windows Korean IBM-1261 LMBCS-17, similar to 1363
 1270 – Windows Sámi
 2001 – Lithuanian KBL (on Star printers); same as code page 771
 3001 – Estonian 1 (on Star printers); same as code page 1116
 3002 – Estonian 2 (on Star printers); same as code page 922
 3011 – Latvian 1 (on Star printers); same as code page 437-Latvian
 3012 – Latvian-2 (on Star printers); same as code page 866-Latvian (Latvian RST 1040-90 National Standard)
 3021 – Bulgarian (on Star printers); same as MIK
 3031 – Hebrew (on Star printers); same as code page 862
 3041 – Maltese (on Star printers); same as ISO 646 Maltese
 3840 – IBM-Russian (on Star printers); nearly the same as CP 866
 3841 – Gost-Russian (on Star printers); GOST 13052 plus characters for Central Asian languages
 3843 – Polish (on Star printers); same as Mazovia
 3844 – CS2 (on Star printers); same as Kamenický
 3845 – Hungarian (on Star printers); same as CWI
 3846 – Turkish (on Star printers); same as PC-8 Turkish + old Turkish Lira sign (Tʟ) at code point A8
 3847 – Brazil-ABNT (on Star printers); same as the Brazilian National Standard NBR-9614:1986
 3848 – Brazil-ABICOMP (on Star printers); same as ABICOMP
 3850 – Standard KU (on Star printers); variation of the Kasetsart University encoding for Thai
 3860 – Rajvitee KU (on Star printers); variation of the Kasetsart University encoding for Thai
 3861 – Microwiz KU (on Star printers); variation of the Kasetsart University encoding for Thai
 3863 – STD988 TIS (on Star printers); variation of the TIS 620 encoding for Thai
 3864 – Popular TIS (on Star printers); variation of the TIS 620 encoding for Thai
 3865 – Newsic TIS (on Star printers); variation of the TIS 620 encoding for Thai
 28799 – FOCAL (on Star printers); same as FOCAL character set
 28800 – HP RPL (on Star printers); same as RPL
 (number missing) – CWI-2 (for DOS) supports Hungarian
 (number missing) – MIK (for DOS) supports Bulgarian
 (number missing) – DOS Serbo-Croatian II; supports Slovenian and Serbo-Croatian (Latin script)
 (number missing) — Russian Alternative code page (for DOS); this is the origin for IBM CP 866

List of code page assignments 

List of known code page assignments (incomplete):

Criticism 
Many older character encodings (unlike Unicode) suffer from several problems. Some vendors insufficiently document the meaning of all code point values in their code pages, which decreases the reliability of handling textual data consistently through various computer systems. Some vendors add proprietary extensions to established code pages, to add or change certain code point values: for example, byte 0x5C in Shift JIS can represent either a back slash or a yen currency symbol depending on the platform. Finally, in order to support several languages in a program that does not use Unicode, the code page used for each string/document needs to be stored.

Applications may also mislabel text in Windows-1252 as ISO-8859-1. The only difference between these code pages is that the code point values in the range 0x800x9F, used by ISO-8859-1 for control characters, are instead used as additional printable characters in Windows-1252 notably for quotation marks, the euro sign and the trademark symbol among others. Browsers on non-Windows platforms would tend to show empty boxes or question marks for these characters, making the text hard to read. Most browsers fixed this by ignoring the character set and interpreting as Windows-1252 to look acceptable. In HTML5, treating ISO-8859-1 as Windows-1252 is even codified as a W3C standard. Although browsers were typically programmed to deal with this behaviour, this was not always true of other software. Consequently, when receiving a file transfer from a Windows system, non-Windows platforms would either ignore these characters or treat them as a standard control characters and attempt to take the specified control action accordingly.

Due to Unicode's extensive documentation, vast repertoire of characters and stability policy of characters, the problems listed above are rarely a concern for Unicode.  UTF-8 (which can encode over one million codepoints) has replaced the code-page method in terms of popularity on the Internet.

Private code pages 
When, early in the history of personal computers, users did not find their character encoding requirements met, private or local code pages were created using terminate-and-stay-resident utilities or by re-programming BIOS EPROMs. In some cases, unofficial code page numbers were invented (e.g. CP895).

When more diverse character set support became available most of those code pages fell into disuse, with some exceptions such as the Kamenický or KEYBCS2 encoding for the Czech and Slovak alphabets. Another character set is Iran System encoding standard that was created by Iran System corporation for Persian language support. This standard was in use in Iran in DOS-based programs and after introduction of Microsoft code page 1256 this standard became obsolete. However some Windows and DOS programs using this encoding are still in use and some Windows fonts with this encoding exist.

In order to overcome such problems, the IBM Character Data Representation Architecture level 2 specifically reserves ranges of code page IDs for user-definable and private-use assignments. Whenever such code page IDs are used, the user must not assume that the same functionality and appearance can be reproduced in another system configuration or on another device or system unless the user takes care of this specifically.
The code page range 57344-61439 (-) is officially reserved for user-definable code pages (or actually CCSIDs in the context of IBM CDRA), whereas the range 65280-65533 (-) is reserved for any user-definable "private use" assignments.
For example, a non-registered custom variant of code page 437 or 28591 could become 57781 or 61359, respectively, in order to avoid potential conflicts with other assignments and maintain the sometimes existing internal numerical logic in the assignments of the original code pages. An unregistered private code page not based on an existing code page, a device specific code page like a printer font, which just needs a logical handle to become addressable for the system, a frequently changing download font, or a code page number with a symbolic meaning in the local environment could have an assignment in the private range like 65280.

The code page IDs 0, 65534 and 65535 are reserved for internal use by operating systems such as DOS and must not be assigned to any specific code pages.

See also 
 Windows code page
 Character encoding
 CCSID IBM's official "code page" definitions and assignments
 Charset detection
 Unicode

References

External links 
 IBM CDRA glossary
 
 
 IBM/ICU Charset Information
 Microsoft Code Page Identifiers (Microsoft's list contains only code pages actively used by normal apps on Windows. See also Torsten Mohrin's list for the full list of supported code pages)
 
 Character Sets And Code Pages At The Push Of A Button
 Microsoft Chcp command: Display and set the console active code page

Character encoding